Tony Tan Keng Yam  (born 7 February 1940) is a Singaporean former politician who served as the seventh president of Singapore between 2011 and 2017. 

Prior to entering politics, Tan was a general manager at OCBC Bank. He made his political debut in the 1979 by-elections as a PAP candidate contesting in Sembawang SMC and won. He went on to serve as Minister for Education between 1980 and 1991, Minister for Finance between 1983 and 1985, and Minister for Defence between 1985 and 1991, Deputy Prime Minister between 1995 and 2005, and Coordinating Minister for National Security between 2003 and 2005. 

Tan resigned from the Cabinet in 2005 and was appointed Deputy Chairman and Executive Director of GIC, the country's sovereign wealth fund, Chairman of the National Research Foundation and Chairman of SPH. He resigned from all of his positions in 2010 before contesting in the 2011 presidential election as an independent candidate.

Tan won the 2011 presidential election in a four-cornered fight and served as the president of Singapore until 2017. He did not seek for a second term in the 2017 presidential election, which was reserved for Malay candidates after a constitutional amendment. He is the only living former president.

Education
Tan was educated at St Patrick's School and St Joseph's Institution before topping his class and graduating from the University of Singapore (now the National University of Singapore) with a Bachelor of Science with first class honours degree in physics, under a scholarship conferred by the Singapore Government. 

He subsequently went on to complete a Master of Science degree in operations research at the Massachusetts Institute of Technology, under the Asia Foundation Scholarship. 

He also completed a Doctor of Philosophy in applied mathematics at the University of Adelaide, and went on to teach mathematics at the University of Singapore.

Career
In 1969, Tan left the University of Singapore and joined OCBC Bank, where he became the general manager, before leaving the bank in 1979 to enter politics.

In December 1991, Tan stepped down from the Cabinet to return to the private sector, where he rejoined OCBC Bank as the chairman and chief executive officer from 1992 to 1995, while retaining his seat in the Parliament as the Member of Parliament for Sembawang GRC.

Tan was appointed as Deputy Chairman and Executive Director of GIC, the country's sovereign wealth fund, following his second retirement from Cabinet in 2005. He was also appointed as Chairman of the National Research Foundation, Deputy Chairman of the Research, Innovation and Enterprise Council, and Chairman of Singapore Press Holdings concurrently.

Tan's tenure at GIC coincided with moves toward greater disclosure in the investment fund's activities amid mounting concerns about the secretive fund's influence after high-profile investments in UBS and Citigroup.

Political career
A former member of the governing People's Action Party (PAP), Tan was elected as the Member of Parliament (MP) for Sembawang GRC after his electoral victory in the 1979 by-elections. He was subsequently appointed as Senior Minister of State for Education in 1979.

Minister for Education (1980–1981, 1985–1991)
He joined the Cabinet in 1980, serving as Minister for Education. As the Minister for Education, Tan scrapped a policy that favoured children of more well-educated mothers ahead of children of less-educated mothers in primary school placement in response to popular discontent and public criticism of the policy which saw PAP receiving the lowest votes since independence during the 1984 general election. 

He also introduced the independent schools system, allowing established educational institutions in Singapore to charge its own fees and have control over their governance and teaching staff, though this was criticised by parents as being "elitist" and made top-ranked schools increasingly out of reach to poorer families due to subsequent fee hikes.

Minister for Trade and Industry (1981–1986)
Tan took on the role of Minister for Trade and Industry from 1981 to 1986. He was also appointed as Minister for Finance from 1983 to 1985, and Minister for Health from 1985 to 1986.

Tan espoused a cut in the Central Provident Fund (CPF) in the 1980s, which Prime Minister Lee Kuan Yew had said would not be allowed except "in an economic crisis".

Tan was also known to have opposed the shipping industry strike in January 1986, the first for about a decade in Singapore, which was sanctioned by fellow Cabinet minister, Ong Teng Cheong, who is also Secretary-General of the National Trades Union Congress, felt the strike was necessary.

As Minister for Trade and Industry, Tan was concerned about investors' reactions to a perceived deterioration of labour relations and the impact on foreign direct investment.

In his analysis, historian Michael Barr explains that older [grassroots] union leaders bore "increasing disquiet" at their exclusion from consultation in NTUC's policies, which were effectively managed by "technocrats" in the government. Unlike the previous NTUC secretary-general Lim Chee Onn, Lee Kuan Yew's protégé Ong Teng Cheong in 1983 had an "implicit pact" with the trade unions—involving grassroots leaders in top decisions and "working actively and forcefully" in the interests of the unions "in a way Lim had never seen to do"—in exchange for the unions' continued "cooperation on the government's core industrial relations strategies". (In 1969, the NTUC had adopted "a cooperative, rather than a confrontational policy towards employers".)

Although striking was prohibited and trade unions were barred from negotiating such matters as promotion, transfer, employment, dismissal, retrenchment, and reinstatement, issues that "accounted for most earlier labour disputes", the government provided measures for workers' safety and welfare, and serious union disputes with employers were almost always handled through the Industrial Arbitration Court, which had powers of both binding arbitration and voluntary mediation. However, Ong felt these measures did not prevent "management [from] taking advantage of the workers", recalling in a 2000 interview in Asiaweek: "Some of them were angry with me about that... the minister for trade and industry [Tan] was very angry, his officers were upset. They had calls from America, asking what happened to Singapore?" However the fact that the strike only lasted two days before "all the issues were settled" was cited by Ong in a 2000 interview with Asiaweek as proof that "management was just trying to pull a fast one".

Tan initially opposed the timing of building the Mass Rapid Transit (MRT) in 1981 when it was raised by Ong. Tan held the view that the local construction industry was overheated at the time, and public housing should take priority.

Deputy Prime Minister (1995–2005)
After Ong Teng Cheong and Lee Hsien Loong were diagnosed with cancer in 1992 and 1993 respectively, Tan was asked to return to Cabinet in August 1995 as Deputy Prime Minister and Minister for Defence. It was reported that he declined an offer of make-up pay, which compensate ministers for a loss in salary when they leave the private sector. Tan declared that "the interests of Singapore must take precedence over that of a bank and my own personal considerations".

In August 2003, he relinquished the portfolio of Minister for Defence and became Coordinating Minister for Security and Defence, while retaining the portfolio of Deputy Prime Minister. He later persuaded Minister for National Development Mah Bow Tan to abandon plans to demolish an old mosque in his constituency of Sembawang. Dubbed the "Last Kampung Mosque in Singapore", it was later designated a heritage site.

Tan joined other dissenting colleagues in opposing the implementation of Integrated Resorts (IRs) with their attached casinos to Singapore. Commenting on a survey of gambling habits conducted by the Ministry of Community Development, Youth and Sports, Tan had said he was "appalled" that a newspaper headline dismissed the number of likely problem gamblers—55,000 as insignificant: "I don't think it's insignificant. Every Singaporean is important. Every Singaporean that gets into trouble means one family that is destroyed. It cannot be a matter of small concern to the Government."

Prime Minister Lee Kuan Yew picked Tan to succeed him as Prime Minister, but Tan declined. Prime Minister Lee once praised Tan for his quick mind and decisiveness. "He would say 'yes or no' and he would stick to it," said Prime Minister Lee.

As Deputy Prime Minister, Tan was instrumental in the establishment of the Singapore Management University (SMU) and shaped its direction and early history. In 1997, the Singapore Government raised the idea of a third university for Singapore. 

Tan believed that the new university should differentiate itself from the two established institutions—the National University of Singapore (NUS) and the Nanyang Technological University (NTU), as the government wanted SMU to be an experiment in diversity. Tan believed that the third university should follow the American example which concentrated on management, business and economics. 

He made trips to universities in the United States to know more about them and search for potential partnerships. He helped to make the third university happen, reaching out to veteran businessman and current Chairman of the SMU Board of Trustees Ho Kwon Ping to help in its establishment. 

Tan, having begun to look after the university education in the 1990s, was the driving force behind SMU, which in 2000 was set up as the country's first publicly-funded autonomous university.

Tan stepped down as Deputy Prime Minister and Coordinating Minister for Security and Defence on 1 September 2005.

2011 presidential election

On 22 December 2010, Tan announced that he would step down from his government-linked positions at GIC and SPH to run for the office of President of Singapore. Tan's campaign stressed his independence and his divergent views from the PAP government in specific policies, citing a remark made by MP Tan Soo Khoon in 2005: "It is probably the first time that I have heard Cabinet ministers, starting with no less than the deputy prime minister, Dr. Tony Tan, expressing divergent views [on the Integrated Resorts question]." However, competing presidential candidates and former PAP members Tan Kin Lian and Tan Cheng Bock questioned Tan's independence from the party. On 7 July 2011, Tony Tan submitted his presidential eligibility forms. In July 2011, Tony Tan stepped down from his positions at GIC and SPH to contest in the presidential election. Tan subsequently won 35.2% of the vote.

On 29 July 2011, Tan responded to online allegations that his son Patrick Tan had received preferential treatment during his National Service (NS). "My sons all completed their National Service obligations fully and I have never intervened in their postings," he said. Tan also noted that he had served as Minister for Defence from 1995 to 2003, while Patrick Tan said that it was in 1988 that he been permitted by the Ministry of Defence (MINDEF) to disrupt his NS for premedical studies in Harvard University, where he graduated with a Bachelor of Science degree in biology and chemistry, and an MD-PhD program at Stanford University under the President's Scholarship and Loke Cheng Kim Scholarship. MINDEF clarified that, prior to 1992, disruptions were allowed for overseas medical studies, and longer periods of disruption were granted for those admitted to universities in the United States, where medicine is a graduate course. American medical students are required to complete a "pre-medical component for a general undergraduate degree" before applying to medical school. In response to a question in Parliament on the subject of deferments, Minister for Defence Ng Eng Hen stated on 20 October 2011 that Patrick Tan had not been given any special treatment.

Campaign platform
Describing himself as "Tested, Trusted, True", Tan said his past experiences will help him steer Singapore through the financial uncertainty lying ahead.

During the Nomination Day on 17 August 2011, Tan unveiled his election symbol—a pair of black glasses which resembles the trademark spectacles he has steadfastly worn for years. His campaign materials, which included caps, postcards and fridge magnets also carried the symbol. About 9,400 posters and 200 banners were printed.

Campaign endorsements
Tan's presidential bid was endorsed by the 10,000-strong Federation of Tan Clan Associations on 7 August 2011. By 13 August 2011, the leaders of 19 NTUC-affiliated unions—which have 128,000 members, had endorsed his bid. On 14 August, the leadership of the Singapore Federation of Chinese Clan Associations (SFCCA) and the Singapore Chinese Chamber of Commerce & Industry (SCCCI) also endorsed his bid. The leadership of another four unions from the construction and real estate sector, which represent more than 50,000 members, endorsed Tan's bid on 16 August. Nine Teochew clan associations also supported Tan. Union leaders in three sectors—Transport and Logistics, Marine and Machinery-engineering, and Infocomm and Media—endorsed Tan on 17 August. They together represent 112,000 workers.
Tan received The Singapore Malay Chamber of Commerce and Industry (SMCCI) endorsed Tan's presidential candidacy on 18 August 2011. It is also was the first Malay organisation to do so.

Campaign proceedings
After a closed door meeting with the Singapore Malay Chamber of Commerce and Industry on 11 August 2011, Tan remarked that it is "not too early" for the government to have contingency plans in case an economic crisis hits Singapore, noting that "with his background and knowledge", he added that he was in a position to provide "a steady hand".

Speaking to reporters after a dialogue with the Singapore Manufacturers' Federation the following day, Tan remarked that it would be a "grave mistake" to phase out manufacturing in Singapore, which has been transitioning to a service economy and an information economy since the 1980s. He then went on to describe manufacturing as a "key pillar of Singapore's economy". Without the sector, he feels Singapore's economy will be "less resilient, less diversified" and there will be "fewer options for our young people and Singapore will lose."

On 15 August 2011, following the National Day Rally speech by Prime Minister Lee Hsien Loong, Tan said that one point he found particularly interesting in Lee's address was whether Singapore would remain pragmatic in its policy making, or if it would turn populist. He added that the temptation to make populist decisions was affecting the presidential election, "with some candidates appealing to the public in ways that could go beyond the parameters of the Singapore's Constitution".

On 17 August 2011, crowds booed at Tan and his son as he delivered his two-minute Nomination Day speech. According to The Straits Times, the jeers came from a vocal group of people who mostly supported another presidential candidate Tan Jee Say. At a press conference later that day, Tony Tan said that while different points of view were to be expected in a campaign, it was disappointing to have people who would not even listen, and hoped that Singaporeans would listen to the views of all the candidates. He said, "I don't think that jeering or heckling is the right way to go about the campaign, particularly in a campaign for the president, which has to be conducted with decorum and dignity."

During the first presidential candidate broadcast on 18 August 2011, while other candidates made promises in their first presidential candidate broadcasts on Thursday night, Tan refrained from making promises during the broadcast and focused on the role of the president instead. Speaking in English, Chinese and Malay, Tan said, "Some people argue that the president must take a public stand on current issues. I hear and share the concerns of Singaporeans. But policies are debated in Parliament and implemented by the government. Others have said that the president must oppose the government. That is a job for the opposition. People interested in such roles should run for Parliament in the next general election."

Presidency (2011–2017)

Tan sought to distinguish his presidency by promoting a more active civil society, believing that Singapore needed to build up its "social reserves" to complement the substantial financial reserves the city state had accumulated over time. An example of this, he said, was the way that he had expanded Singapore's President's Challenge charity event to go beyond fund-raising to promote volunteerism and social entrepreneurship.

On 8 November 2016, Tan announced that he would not be standing in 2017 presidential election, which was reserved for Malay candidates after a constitutional amendment on 9 November 2016. Tan left office on 31 August 2017. He was succeeded by Halimah Yacob who became president after a walkover of the presidential elections, as no other candidates were deemed eligible.

Other appointments
From 1980 to 1981, Tan served as Vice-Chancellor of the National University of Singapore. Tan was subsequently ex officio'' appointed Chancellor of the National University of Singapore and the Nanyang Technological University when he was elected as the president of Singapore in 2017.

Tan had served as patron of many organisations, including the Singapore Dance Theatre, Singapore Computer Society, SJI International, Duke–NUS Medical School, and the MIT Club of Singapore. He was also named as the first patron of Dover Park Hospice in May 2011.

On 21 November 2017, GIC, the country's sovereign wealth fund, announced that Tan will be appointed Director and Special Advisor from 1 January 2018.

Personal life

Tan's paternal grandfather was Tan Cheng Siong, the former general manager of OCBC Bank. His uncle was former Chairman of OCBC Bank, Tan Chin Tuan. Through his maternal grandmother Annie Tan Sun Neo, he is also a great-great-great grandson of philanthropist Tan Kim Seng. 

When Tan was a first year physics student in 1959 at the University of Malaya—the predecessor of the National University of Singapore—at Bukit Timah campus, he met an arts undergraduate whom he fell in love and would marry five years later. Tan married Mary Chee Bee Kiang in 1964 and they have children together.

Honours
In 2005, Tan was presented the NUS Eminent Alumni Award in recognition of his role as a visionary architect of Singapore's university sector.

In 2010, he was presented the inaugural Distinguished Australian Alumnus Award by the Australian Alumni Singapore (AAS) at its 55th anniversary dinner in recognition of his distinguished career, and his significant contribution to society and to the Australian alumni community.

Tan was awarded a medal from the Foreign Policy Association in 2011 for "outstanding leadership and service".

In 2014, Tan was conferred an honorary doctorate by his alma mater, the University of Adelaide, for his "long record of outstanding achievements both as a leader in the Singapore government and in the business sectors. He was also made a Knight Grand Cross of the Order of the Bath.

In 2018, Tan received the top honour of the Order of Temasek (First Class) during Singapore's National Day Awards.

References

|-

|-

|-

|-

|-

|-

|-

|-

1940 births
Honorary Knights Grand Cross of the Order of the Bath
Independent politicians in Singapore
Living people
MIT School of Engineering alumni
Deputy Prime Ministers of Singapore
Ministers for Defence of Singapore
Finance ministers of Singapore
Members of the Parliament of Singapore
Academic staff of the National University of Singapore
People's Action Party politicians
Presidents of Singapore
Saint Joseph's Institution, Singapore alumni
Singaporean Anglicans
Singaporean mathematicians
Singaporean people of Hokkien descent
Singaporean politicians of Chinese descent
University of Adelaide alumni
University of Singapore alumni
Recipients of the Darjah Utama Temasek
Ministers for Education of Singapore
Ministers for Trade and Industry of Singapore